Isidore Ramishvili (8 July 1859 – 3 January 1937) was a Georgian Social Democratic politician, journalist, and one of the leaders of Menshevik movement in Imperial Russia.

During the Russian Revolution of 1905, he was elected to the First State Duma for the Kutais Governorate and became one of its leading Menshevik deputies. He also chaired the proceedings that resulted in Joseph Stalin’s expulsion from the party. Arrested in 1908, he remained in exile in Astrakhan until the Russian Revolution of 1917.

He served as a member of the Executive Committee of the Petrograd Soviet. He led a special committee established to organise the Petrograd Burial Procession of March 1917.

Following the Bolshevik October Revolution  he returned to his native Georgia, where he was elected to the Constituent Assembly of the Democratic Republic of Georgia in 1919. From summer 1918 to September 1920, he was an envoy of the Government of Georgia to autonomous Abkhazia. The Red Army invasion of Georgia early in 1921, forced him to retire from politics.

References 

Mikaberidze, Alexander (ed., 2007), Ramishvili, Isidor. The Dictionary of Georgian National Biography. Retrieved on April 28, 2007.
Jones, Stephen F. (2005), Socialism in Georgian Colors: The European Road to Social Democracy, 1883-1917. Harvard University Press, .

1859 births
1937 deaths
People from Guria
People from Kutais Governorate
Russian Social Democratic Labour Party members
Mensheviks
Social Democratic Party of Georgia politicians
Members of the 1st State Duma of the Russian Empire
Russian Constituent Assembly members
Democratic Republic of Georgia